The Shanghai People's Press is a printing and publishing house based in Shanghai. It was established in 1972, replacing the Shanghai Publishing Bureau which was reinstated on January 1, 1978.

See also
 List of companies of China

References

Publishing companies of China
Companies based in Shanghai
Publishing companies established in 1972
Mass media in Shanghai
Chinese companies established in 1972